Megan Jennifer Connolly (9 April 1974 – 6 September 2001) was an Australian actress, mainly of soap opera. She grew up in the northern Sydney suburb of St Ives, New South Wales.

Career
Connolly's film debut was 1990's The Crossing with Russell Crowe. She later played Tori Hayden in the soap opera Paradise Beach Later she hosted the television shows The Zone and Body Corp. She also acted in the TV series Breakers.

She was Foxtel's Channel V VJ through 1997. On stage, she starred in the musical Resurrected!. Connolly temporarily replaced Belinda Emmett as Rebecca Nash in Home and Away.

Death
Megan died from a heroin overdose on 6 September 2001 at the age of 27 while staying at a relative's home in New South Wales, Australia.

References

External links

 

1974 births
2001 deaths
Australian film actresses
Australian television actresses
Deaths by heroin overdose in Australia
Australian VJs (media personalities)
Actresses from New South Wales